Mohannad Mahdi Al-Nadawi or Mohanned Mehdi Al-Nadawi an Iraqi footballer. He is the first foreign footballer who became the Top Goal Scorer in Iranian Football League. In the 1999/2000 season, he scored a total of 14 goals, ahead of Iranian super goal scorers Behnam Seraj and Hamid Reza Ebrahimi.

References

http://www.rsssf.com/tablesi/iran00.html

1975 births
Living people
People from Kut
Iraqi footballers
Sanat Naft Abadan F.C. players
Iraqi expatriate footballers
Expatriate footballers in Iran
Azadegan League players
Association football forwards